Chan Nai-Ming is a Hong Kong citizen, believed to be the first person in the world convicted of the crime of illegal mass distribution of copyrighted works using BitTorrent Peer-to-peer file sharing.  Chan was 38 years old and unemployed at the time of his arrest.

Alleged incident
Chan Nai-Ming was accused of uploading three Hollywood films (Daredevil, Miss Congeniality and Red Planet) onto the Internet using BitTorrent under the webhandle , which can be translated as either “Master of Cunning” or “Big Crook”.

Trial
He was charged with 3 counts of “attempting to distribute an infringing copy of a copyright work (otherwise than for the purpose of, in the course of, any trade or business) to such an extent as to affect prejudicially the owner of the copyright, without the licence of the copyright owner, contrary to sections 118(1)(f) and 119(1) of the Copyright Ordinance, Cap. 528 and section 159G of the Crimes Ordinance, Cap. 200” and 3 counts of an alternative charge of “Obtaining access to a computer with dishonest intent, contrary to section 161(1)(c) of the Crimes Ordinance, Cap. 200”.  Since the first 3 charges were proven, the last 3 charges were dropped.

Chan was sentenced to three months in prison on 8 November 2005.  The maximum penalty under law was four years in prison.

At the Tuen Mun Magistracy, Magistrate Colin Mackintosh said that he had reduced the term because this was Chan's first offence and the first sentencing for such a case in the world. However, the judge claimed that anyone else caught illegally sharing files in the wake of his judgment could expect tougher treatment.

Appeals
He was released on bail for HK$5000 while waiting for the results of the appeal to the High Court.  On 12 December 2006, the High Court upheld the original verdict and sentence.  He was jailed immediately.

The High Court denied him leave to appeal to the Court of Final Appeal, but he was bailed for HK$5000 on 3 January 2007 to seek leave for appeal at the CFA (leave can be granted by either the High Court or the CFA). On 7 February, the CFA granted him leave. Oral arguments were held on 9 May 2007. Chan's lawyer said the word "copies" only refers to tangible objects like CDs and tapes. Digital files don't count. He also said that UK law distinguish between the two by having separate "Distribution Right" for tangible objects and "Communication Right" for intangible files. Also, it is the downloader that initiated the transfer, thereby copying the work. Chan merely put it on the net. The government's lawyers disagreed. The decision is reserved.

The judge from the court of final appeal ruled out Chan's appeal on 18 May 2007. The result was that Chan's appeal was rejected, and the original sentence (3 months in jail) was upheld.

References

External links
TMCC 1268/2005 HKSAR v CHAN NAI MING original judgment, reported at HKSAR v Chan Nai Ming [2005] 4 HKLRD 142
HCMA 1221/2005 HKSAR v CHAN NAI MING High Court appeal judgment, reported at [2007] 1 HKLRD 95 
FAMC 0061/2006 HKSAR v CHAN NAI MING CFA bail pending leave application, reported at [2007] HKEC 6
FAMC 0061A/2006 HKSAR v CHAN NAI MING CFA bail pending appeal, reported at [2007] HKEC 253
FACC 0003/2007 CHAN NAI MING v HKSAR CFA appeal judgment, reported at [2007] 2 HKLRD 489

Academic opinion
Hong Kong’s copyright laws: Recent developments and dilemmas Clayton G. MacKenzie, Acta Juridica Hungarica (2007) 48, 115-124 
The Hong Kong BitTorrent Case (HKSAR v CHAN NAI MING): Will Big Crook Go Down Big Time for a Little Infringement? Stuart Weinstein & Charles Wild, Working Paper (abstract only), April 2007
Big Crook in Little China: The Ramifications of the Hong Kong BitTorrent Case on the Criminal Test of Prejudicial Effect Michael Filby, Working Paper, February 2007
Criminal Infringement of Copyright: The Big Crook Case Steven Gething, in Brian Fitzgerald, Fuping Gao, Damien O'Brien, Sampsung Xiaoxiang Shi (eds), Copyright Law, Digital Content and the Internet in the Asia-Pacific (2008) 367

Journalistic reports
New York Times 8 November 2005
BBC 7 November 2005

Chinese male criminals
Chan, Nai Ming
Hong Kong criminals
Year of birth missing (living people)
Living people